Bituminous Coal Operators Association (BCOA) is a coal mining lobbying organization. It was founded in 1950 by various companies to deal with the UMWA and unionizing of mines during the change from human labor to mechanical labor. The BCOA would strike deals between miners, mine companies, and coal buying companies to provide a steady flow of continuous labor and a steady purchasing price for coal. The main deals normally contained negotiations of some miners being put out of work by mechanizations while the miners left would be guaranteed a steady job and pay as long as they agreed to not hold up progress with strikes and other activities. In addition, the BCOA hears requests from the UMWA employees for pay raises but often results in unprotected employees being laid off after a deal has been reached. The current president of BCOA is David M Young. He is the main representative for the BCOA and lobbyist.

History  

BCOA was formed in 1950 as a group to negotiate with the UMWA on behalf of large coal companies located in the Appalachian region. BCOA agreed to provide job security to workers in mining companies who were part of BCOA and also negotiate wages and benefits. UMWA and BCOA came to an agreement that miners would not strike against layoffs if they were allowed health benefits and a fair wage. BCOA still exists today but is much smaller organization and is now mainly used for lobbying for important coal issues. BCOA recently has been working with the UMWA and Murray mines to negotiate a new contract between thousands of workers  in West Virginia, Ohio, and Pennsylvania.

Legacy of the Health and Retirement Agreement

In 1946, under President John L. Lewis, the union created The Welfare and Retirement Fund. This was an entirely new method for benefits and pensions because it introduced health care for the union workers and their families.

In May 1946, the National Bituminous Coal Wage Agreement established a health, welfare, and retirement fund backed up by a five-cents-per-ton levy on all coal produced by bituminous coal companies.

From the 1950s to the 1970s, there were various updates to the agreement with the goal to completely satisfy miners enough to end random wildcat strikes throughout coal mines across the country. By 1974, the coal industry led the country for the rate of work stoppages in a year, ten times the rate in other industries.

On December 6, 1974, a new National Bituminous Coal Wage Agreement resulted in the development of four separate trust funds, replacing the single Welfare and Retirement Funds. 
The 1950 Benefit Pension Trust was created for workers retiring before 1976; the 1974 Pension Trust, for workers retiring after 1975; the 1950 Benefit Trust, provides medical and death benefits for workers retiring after 1975 and their dependents; and the 1974 Benefit Trust, providing medical and death benefits for workers retiring after 1975 and their dependents. These four funds operate collectively under the title Health and Retirement Funds.

This agreement sparked an unending conflict between the BCOA and the UMWA. The main problem being the fact that the UMWA cannot present an agreement that can stand, and after time the BCOA does not deem the agreement any longer acceptable, which leads to multiple modifications as time progresses.

For taxpayers, the agreement seems entirely unfair. As the UMWA makes modifications to the agreements, such as the changes it made in 1974 which resulted in 5.57 billion dollars worth of unfunded liabilities. These liabilities and money that is unaccounted for is coming out of taxpayers paychecks. This original agreement in 1940 has stemmed many arguments between the UMWA and the BCOA even until today (2018).

Timeline of lobbying activity 

The majority of this has been work on specific acts like the Safety acts, which deals with health benefits to miners, and other smaller health acts or protection bills like the Federal mine and health and safety act of 1977 which was created by the Mine Safety and Health Administration (MSHA) who deal with the BCOA on many accounts. The BCOA also works on an average of one land restoration act a year like the Crow Tribe Land Restoration Act which was passed in 2009.

References 

United Mine Workers of America, Health and Retirement Funds records, 1940-1993 1827

The miners’ strike of 1977–78 | International Socialist Review

External links

 contacts can be found at Bloomberg - Are you a robot?

Bibliography
United Mine Workers of America Members Ratify New Five-Year Agreement with The Bituminous Coal Operators Association. PR Newswire Association LLC, 2001.
United mine workers of America. The New proposed contract between United Mine Workers of America and the Bituminous Coal Operators' Association. Place of publication not identified] , 1978.
Putney, B. (1935). Stabilization of the bituminous coal industry. Editorial research reports 1935 (Vol. II). Washington, DC: CQ Press. Retrieved from http://library.cqpress.com/cqresearcher/cqresrre1935072400
"The Bituminous Coal Problem." Editorial Research Reports 1925, vol. III, CQ Press, 1925, p. 491. CQ Researcher, 20 Feb. 2018, library.cqpress.com/cqresearcher/cqresrre1925081500.
“Union Mine Workers Vote to Approve New Contract with Murray Energy.” Charleston Gazette-Mail, 21 Nov. 2017, www.wvgazettemail.com/news/union-mine-workers-vote-to-approve-new-contract-with-murray/article_1f799654-97ea-5b22-85ea-e2fc241e68dc.html.
“UMWA-BCOA Ratify New Agreement.” CA-Black-Transp, 6 July 2011, www.coalage.com/news/latest/1146-umwa-bcoa-ratify-new-agreement.html#.WqraHejwa00.

Lobbying organizations based in Washington, D.C.
Coal industry
Organizations established in 1950